Ian Parovel (born 1983 in France), is a French art director, film director, game designer, screenwriter, and designer living in Saint-Germain-en-Laye.

He is best known as the creator and screenwriter of the 3D animated television series The Podcats and the Legends Of Luma game collection.

It was during the ceremony of the As d'Or/Game of the Year 2015 that he was noticed by the boardgame industry, being congratulated several times by the various laureates during the show.

Biography 

It was during his childhood that his grandfather and his uncle introduced him to video editing, by training him to video tools and shooting super 8 films. Later, in 1995, discovering the Amiga demoscene that he will be particularly interested in the animation of synthesis, while being initiated to Lightwave.

After an education in business school, Ian Parovel pursued literary studies in audiovisual section at the Lycom (French movie school). He will then give up in the last year, in favor of a booming activity: Video Jockeying. Fascinated by television programs dealing with virtual images such as Micro Kid's Multimedia featuring virtual characters, the Imagina festival and Pixar's first short films, he decided to devote himself entirely to the creation of computer-generated images and animations.

It was also during these years that he learned by himself most of the graphic software suites, as well as coding demos.

In 2007 he was spotted by Eric Chevalier, director of the show Micro Kid's, who invited him to join the animation studio Okidoki to create a new animated series, The Podcats, on which he worked for nearly 5 years.

Since the success of the series, his skills are demanded by video game studios (Ubisoft) and board games (Ludonaute, Asmodee) in addition to his activity as art director for other studios (Disney Television, EuropaCorp).

In 2017 he created with Ludonautes a new series of board games in an all-new episodic and linear format called serial games: The Legends Of Luma.

In 2020 he joins Board Game Arena for which he already worked since 2016, mostly on the overall design and graphic chart. He will then take care of the UX, reaching 5 Millions members in December 2020.

Author of games and books, he also gives lectures about the links between design, interfaces and gameplay.

Filmography 
 2001 : Dream, short movie concept : Film director / Animator
 2005 : Aldebert, 3D animated short movie : Film director, Screenwriter, Animator
 2007 : La couleur des anges, stop-motion short movie : Film director, Screenwriter, Animator
 2008-2009 : The Badabops, Animated TV show, Disney Television Network : Compositing/FX
 2009-2011 : The Podcats Season 1, Animated 3D TV show, France Télévision : Creator, Author, Screenwriter, Art Director
 2011-2013 : The Podcats Season 2, Animated 3D TV show, France Télévision : Creator, Art Director
 2010 : Dress me up - Fashion Week 1st Edition, TV Advert : Film director
 2010 : 8 to 9, short movie : Screenwriter, Film director
 2011 : Buzz Me i'm Fashion - Fashion Week 2nd Edition, TV Advert : Film director
 2011 : Lights in the city - Fashion Week 3rd Edition, TV Advert using light-painting : Film director
 2011 : WhyTivi, TV Identity : Creator
 2013 : 300 000 Kilomètres/Seconde, short movie : Compositing/VFX
 2014 : Detective Academy, Advert : Compositing/VFX
 2014 : Colt Express, Advert : Film director
 2016 : Ticket to Ride, Advert : Film director
 2017 : Legends Of Luma, Advert : Film director

Games

Graphic designer 
 GOSU, 2010, Moonster Games/Asmodee
 Fame Us, 2011, Moonster Games/Asmodee
 Hattari, 2011, Moonster Games
 GOSU: Kamakor, 2011, Moonster Games/Asmodee
 GOSU 2: Tactics, 2012, Moonster Games
 Streams, 2012, Moonster Games/Asmodee
 Texas Zombies, 2012, Moonster Games/Asmodee
 Minivilles (aka Machi Koro), 2013, Moonster Games/Asmodee
 Koryo, 2013, Moonster Games/Asmodee
 Choson, 2014, Moonster Games/Asmodee
 Colt Express, 2014, Ludonaute
 DEUS, 2014, Pearl Games
 Ryu, 2015, Moonster Games Asia
 Intrigues, 2016, Igiari
 DEUS: Egypt, 2016, Pearl Games
 Oh Capitaine!—Legends Of Luma, 2017, Ludonaute
 Nomads—Legends Of Luma, 2017, Ludonaute

Art director 
 Minivilles (also known as Machi Koro), 2013, Moonster Games/Asmodee
 DEUS, 2014, Pearl Games
 Le Petit Prince: Voyage vers les étoiles, 2014, Ludonaute
 Touch Down!, 2017, Happy Baobab
 Oh Capitaine!—Legends Of Luma, 2017, Ludonaute
 Nomads—Legends Of Luma, 2017, Ludonaute

Game designer 
 A Table, 2009, Ugines Games Award
 Cadavres, 2010, Morten Publishing
 My Big World, 2014, with Dave Choi, Happy Baobab
 My Big World: Korea, 2014, with Dave Choi, Happy Baobab

Role-playing books 
 Mon voisin Frankenstein, 2002, electronic book
 Phalanx, 2005, electronic book

Video games 
 Crazy Dog (mobile), 2007, Mighty Troglodytes
 Smash The Mole (mobile), 2007, Mighty Troglodytes
 Gob'nFrog (mobile), 2007, Mighty Troglodytes
 Lucky Luke: Outlaws (mobile), 2008, Mighty Troglodytes
 The Legend of Spyro: The Eternal Night (mobile), 2008, Mighty Troglodytes
 Podcats: Guitar Zéro (web), 2009, Okidoki Studio
 SearchMan (web), 2010, Okidoki Studio
 Wagaaa! (web), 2010, Okidoki Studio
 The Podcats Virtual Web Tour (web), 2011, Okidoki Studio
 Wargame: Red Dragoon (PC), 2014, Ubisoft/Eugen System

Conferences 
 Intuitivité & Ergonomie : Le facteur humain dans l’interface homme-machine, 2013, Open du Web, Paris
 Make The Logo Bigger : An how-to graphic design for games, 2017, Master Class of BoardGame Design, Séoul

Awards 
 2006 : 1st place Festival De Courts for the animated short-movie Aldebert
 2007 : 1st place Concours des créateurs d'Ugine for the game A Table
 2009 : International Design Award Best in ClassInternational Design Award for art direction of the animated series The Podcats
 2009 : W3 Gold Awards World Wide Web Award for technical performance on The Podcats official website
 2010 : Interactive Media Awards (IMA) for the dedicated games & website for The Podcats
 2010 : Junior Communication Award Actukids for the marketing campaign on The Podcats
 2012 : Nominated As d'or Jeu de l'année for the boardgame Fame Us
 2014 : Nominated As d'or Jeu de l'année for the boardgame Koryo
 2015 : 1st place Award As d'or Jeu de l'année for the boardgame Colt Express and nominated for Minivilles
 2015 : Spiel Des Jahres Award Spiel Des Jahres for the boardgame Colt Express

References

External links 
 
 Alliance Française des Designers  
Ian Parovel games on TricTrac.net  
  Ian Parovel on BoardGameGeek.com 
 Deus, le jeu de société, Officiel website for Deus boardgame 
 Zapping arty du nouvel Obs : Light Painting 
  Ian games on boardgamestories.com 

French game designers
1983 births
French television writers
Living people